The Americas Zone was one of the three regional zones of the 1976 Davis Cup.

This year's tournament saw all teams in the Americas Zone competing in one single bracket, with the previous North & Central America and South America sub-zones, and subsequently the Americas Inter-Zonal final, being eliminated. This brought the Americas Zone in line with the outline of the other zones, with the previous year's Americas sub-zone champions progressing to the new Americas main draw semifinals.

14 teams entered the Americas Zone in total, with 12 teams competing in the preliminary rounds to advance to the main draw and join the previous year's finalists South Africa and Chile. The winner of the main draw went on to compete in the Inter-Zonal Zone against the winners of the Eastern Zone and Europe Zone.

Chile defeated South Africa in the final and progressed to the Inter-Zonal Zone.

Preliminary rounds

Draw

First round
Mexico vs. Caribbean/West Indies

Canada vs. Colombia

Peru vs. Uruguay

Qualifying round
United States vs. Venezuela

Mexico vs. Canada

Brazil vs. Peru

Ecuador vs. Argentina

Main draw

Draw

Quarterfinals
Mexico vs. United States

Argentina vs. Brazil

Semifinals
South Africa vs. Mexico

For the second year in succession, due to their opposition to the apartheid policies of the South African government, Mexico withdrew from their tie against South Africa. As a result Mexico defaulted the tie and South Africa were declared the winners by default.

Chile vs. Argentina

Final
Chile vs. South Africa

References

External links
Davis Cup official website

Davis Cup Americas Zone
Americas
Davis Cup
Davis Cup
Davis Cup
Davis Cup